Tony Harborn (born 26 August 1956) is a Swedish Paralympian who won two silver medals at the sixth Paralympic Games in Arnhem, Netherlands 1980, in the 80m CP C and 800 m CP C events and the silver in the 1000m Cross Country C6 event at the seventh Paralympic Games, New York, USA 1984. In recent years, Tony Harborn has served on the board of the County of Värmland Disabled Athletes Association and is currently employed as the statistician to IF Göta, Karlstad, Sweden.

References

Living people
1956 births
Paralympic athletes of Sweden
Athletes (track and field) at the 1980 Summer Paralympics
Athletes (track and field) at the 1984 Summer Paralympics
Paralympic silver medalists for Sweden
Medalists at the 1980 Summer Paralympics
Medalists at the 1984 Summer Paralympics
Paralympic medalists in athletics (track and field)
Swedish male middle-distance runners